People Music is a studio album by American jazz bassist Christian McBride together with his band Inside Straight. The record was released on  via the Mack Avenue label.

Background
People Music is the second album for McBride's band Inside Straight. The album comes nearly four years after the band’s debut record, Kind of Brown. The present album features eight original compositions, four of which were written by McBride. His originals include the composition “New Hope’s Angel” written when Whitney Houston died. The core group performed six tracks; the other two pieces were recorded by a slightly different lineup.

Reception
Jeff Tamarkin of Jazz Times noted "Following a one-off big-band outing, this is his second with Inside Straight, the acoustic quintet he formed in 2009. Like that year’s Kind of Brown, People Music feels like a mental reboot, an opportunity for McBride to call the shots on his own terms with some handpicked compadres".

Corey Brown of Notreble said "The new album finds the quintet in hard-swing mode, delivering what they call “more road-tested, ‘lived-in’ Inside Straight” in an accessible way, and one that makes the audience part of the experience."

Track listing

Personnel

Band
Christian McBride – bass
Carl Allen – drums (2-6, 8)
Peter Martin – piano (2-6, 8)
Ulysses Owens – drums (1, 7)
Christian Sands – piano (1, 7)
Warren Wolf – vibes
Steve Wilson – saxophones

Production
Keith H. Brown – illustrations
Joe Ferla – engineer
Randall Kennedy – creative director
Chi Modu – photography
Raj Naik – art direction, design
Al Pryor – A&R
Mark Wilder – mastering

Chart performance

References

External links
 Christian McBride Discography

2013 albums
Christian McBride albums
Mack Avenue Records albums